Essere o sembrare is the 11th studio album from Italian rock band Litfiba.

Track listing
 La Tela del Ragno
 Sette Vite
 Stasera
 Giorni di Vento
 No Mai
 Alba e Tempesta
 Prendere o Lasciare
 Mystery Train
 Sottile Ramo

Personnel
Gianluigi Cavallo – Vocals
Ghigo Renzulli – Guitars
Gianmarco Colzi – Drums
Gianluca Venier – Bass
Antonio Aiazzi - Keyboards

References 

Litfiba albums
2005 albums
EMI Records albums
Italian-language albums